L. Raja is an Indian director and actor who works in predominantly Tamil language films and television series.

Career 
Raja began his career as an assistant to director Rajasekhar. He debuted as a director with Shankar Guru in 1987, which was produced by AVM Productions.
He worked as a director in nine films, six of which starred Arjun. After a sabbatical of around 30 years, a director approached Raja and asked him to act in the feature film Muniyandi Vilangial Moonramandu in 2008, which marked his acting debut. He has since acted  in 35 films including  Naadodigal, where he played Sasikumar's father.

He debuted in television with Raghuvamsam which received positive reviews. He has since acted in several television series and directed two series: Idhi Kadha Kaadhu and Ninne Pelladutha for Radaan Mediaworks. He also directed Himsaveda, a silent dance drama for AVM Productions.

Personal life 
Raja is married to actress Easwari Rao in 2005. The couple have 2 children: 1 son and 1 daughter.

Filmography

As director 
Films
Shankar Guru (1987)
Thaimel Aanai (1988)
Kalicharan (1988)
Kuttravali (1989)
Vettaiyaadu Vilaiyaadu (1989)
Sonthakkaran (1989)
Dhool Parakuthu (1993)

Serials

As an actor

Films

Serials

References

External links 
 

Living people
Tamil film directors
Telugu film directors
Male actors in Tamil cinema
20th-century Indian film directors
Indian male film actors
Tamil male television actors
Male actors in Telugu television
Year of birth missing (living people)
Place of birth missing (living people)